Nick Mullins (born 31 January 1966) is a British journalist and sports commentator, primarily working on BT Sport's Premiership Rugby coverage.

Early life
Mullins began his career as a journalist with the Loughborough Trader and Loughborough Echo.

Commentary career
Mullins joined the BBC in 1985 and moved to BBC Radio Sport in 1991.

He was part of the Rugby Special team and covered Six Nations Championship, Premiership, Heineken Cup and Anglo-Welsh Cup rugby matches for the BBC. He also commentated at Wimbledon for Radio 5 Live. He has commentated at the Olympic Games since 1996.

In 2010 Mullins left the BBC to commentate on ESPN's rugby coverage. Mullins was also ITV Sport's chief commentator at the 2011 Rugby World Cup in New Zealand and 2015 Rugby World Cup, where he commentated on the final with Ben Kay and Lawrence Dallaglio. In 2013, Mullins moved to BT Sport following their acquisition of the Premiership Rugby rights and their subsequent takeover of ESPN. He has also provided commentary from the French Open Tennis for ITV Sport, and the University Boat Race.
He was part of the BBC Commentary team for the 2015 Wimbledon Championships.

Writing
As well as commentating, Mullins has contributed to blogs from some of the events he has commentated at, including the Olympic Games and French Open. He is also a columnist for ESPN Scrum.com.

Personal life
Mullins is a supporter of Leicester City. He was previously married to Radio 5 Live presenter Eleanor Oldroyd, and they have two children. In 2016, Mullins married Melissa Platt. Platt was a reporter for Sky Sports but is now the Head of Communications for Wasps Rugby Club and the Head of Media for the Rugby Players' Association (RPA).

References

English rugby union commentators
Living people
1966 births
BBC sports presenters and reporters
BT Sport presenters and reporters